Timbun Mata Island is the largest island on the south side of Darvel Bay, in Semporna, Sabah, Malaysia. The island is mountainous and was formerly (pre-2000) densely wooded. The south side of the island is only separated from the mainland by a shallow channel known as the Trusan Sigalong.

History

The island has been inhabited since before records were kept. There are several villages on the island which have been there for at least several hundred years, Mantandak (in the west), Lakai Lakai (north), Dap Dap (northeast) and Kubor (east). In addition there are newer, illegal settlements which have sprung up on the southeastern portion of the island.

The island was declared a forest reserve in 1930, but had been planted in teak as early as the 1880s. The teak forests have been periodically surveyed, but inroads by illegal logging and land clearing has reduced them.

See also
 List of islands of Minecraft

References
 United States Navy Publication 163, Chapter 10, prepared by the National Imagery and Mapping Agency.
 
 UN Systemwide Earthwatch

Islands of Sabah